Admiral of the Fleet Sir Frederick Charles Doveton Sturdee, 1st Baronet  (9 June 18597 May 1925) was a Royal Navy officer. After training as a torpedo officer, he commanded two different cruisers and then three different battleships before becoming commander of the 1st Battle Squadron of the Home Fleet. He went on to command the 3rd Cruiser Squadron and then the 2nd Cruiser Squadron.

Just before the start of the First World War Sturdee became Chief of War Staff at the Admiralty. In November 1914 the Royal Navy suffered a serious defeat at the Battle of Coronel. In response Sturdee was sent to the South Atlantic to seek out the German squadron, commanded by Graf Maximilian von Spee, which had caused the damage at Coronel. On 8 December 1914, while coaling at Stanley, Sturdee encountered von Spee and the subsequent action became known as the Battle of the Falkland Islands. Von Spee, finding that he was engaged with a superior force, was forced to flee. In the course of the pursuit Sturdee's forces sank almost the entire German squadron. Only one light cruiser escaped but she was hunted down in March 1915.

In the closing years of the war Sturdee served as commander of the 4th Battle Squadron in the Grand Fleet and then as Commander-in-Chief, The Nore.

Naval career

Early career
Born the son of Captain Frederick Sturdee RN and Anna Frances Sturdee (née Hodson) in Charlton, Kent, Sturdee was educated at the Royal Naval School at New Cross and then joined the Royal Navy as a cadet in the training ship HMS Britannia on 15 July 1871. Promoted to midshipman on 19 July 1873, he was appointed to the frigate , flagship of the China Station in 1876. Promoted to sub-lieutenant on 9 June 1878 and to lieutenant on 7 February 1880, he joined the brig  at Portsmouth in May 1880 and then transferred to the torpedo depot ship  in the Mediterranean Fleet in February 1881. He took part in the bombardment of Alexandria in July 1882 during the Anglo-Egyptian War.

Promoted to commander on 30 June 1893, he transferred to the Admiralty as a torpedo specialist in the Directorate of Naval Ordnance. He became commanding officer of the cruiser  on the Australian Station in November 1897 and became involved in managing the tensions with Germany and the United States over the Samoan Islands in 1899. His handling of this situation, which involved a tense stand-off with the German representatives, earned him his promotion to captain on 30 June 1899, and his appointment as a Companion of the Order of St Michael and St George in the 1900 New Year Honours list on 1 January 1900 (he was invested in person by Queen Victoria at Windsor Castle on 1 March 1900).

Sturdee returned to the Admiralty as assistant director of naval intelligence (foreign division) from 1 January 1900, serving as such until 16 October 1902, when he was appointed in command of the protected cruiser . Appointed a member, 4th class, of the Royal Victorian Order (MVO) on 21 April 1903 during King Edward's visit to Malta, he became commanding officer of the armoured cruiser  in the Home Fleet in November 1903. He went on to be commanding officer of the battleship  and Chief of Staff to the Commander-in-Chief of the Mediterranean Fleet in May 1905. Advanced to Commander of the Royal Victorian Order on 16 April 1906, he became commanding officer of the battleship  and then of the battleship  in a new role as Chief of Staff of the Channel Fleet in 1907. He was appointed an aide-de-camp to the King on 26 October 1907. Promoted to rear-admiral on 12 September 1908, he became Rear Admiral commanding the 1st Battle Squadron of the Home Fleet, with his flag in the battleship , in 1910. He became President of the Submarine Committee of the Admiralty in early 1911 and then became commander of the 3rd Cruiser Squadron of the Home Fleet, with his flag in the cruiser , in December 1911. He went on to become commander of the 2nd Cruiser Squadron of the Home Fleet, with his flag in Shannon again, in 1913. He was appointed a Knight Commander of the Order of the Bath on 3 June 1913. Promoted to vice-admiral on 13 December 1913, he became Chief of War Staff at the Admiralty in July 1914.

First World War

In November 1914 the Royal Navy suffered a demoralising defeat when it lost two armoured cruisers at the Battle of Coronel. After Winston Churchill insisted that Sturdee should not be made a scapegoat for the events at Coronel, Admiral Lord Fisher sent a squadron commanded by Sturdee, with his flag in the battlecruiser , to the South Atlantic to seek out the German squadron, commanded by Graf Maximilian von Spee, which had caused the damage at Coronel. This decision was compounded by the fact that Fisher "detested" Sturdee and wanted to remove him from the Admiralty. On 8 December 1914, while coaling at Stanley, Sturdee encountered von Spee and the subsequent action became known as the Battle of the Falkland Islands. Von Spee, finding that he was engaged with a superior force, was forced to flee. Only the light cruiser  escaped but she was hunted down in March 1915. For his part in this important naval action Sturdee was created a baronet on 15 March 1916 with the title "of the Falkland Is."

Sturdee became commander of the 4th Battle Squadron in the Grand Fleet, with his flag in the battleship , in January 1915 and directed his squadron at the Battle of Jutland in May 1916. He was advanced to Knight Commander of the Order of St Michael and St George on 31 May 1916 and awarded the Cross of Commander of the French Legion of Honour on 15 September 1916.

Promoted to full admiral on 17 May 1917, Sturdee was appointed Grand Officer of the Italian Order of Saints Maurice and Lazarus on 11 August 1917, and became Commander-in-Chief, The Nore in March 1918. He was promoted to Admiral of the Fleet on his retirement on 5 July 1921 and advanced to Knight Grand Cross of the Order of the Bath on 1 January 1921. He was President of the Society for Nautical Research (1922–1925).

Personal life

In 1882 Sturdee married Marion Andrews (died 1940): they had a son and a daughter.

Sturdee retired to Camberley, in Surrey, and died there on 7 May 1925. He was buried in the churchyard of St Peter's Church in nearby Frimley. His gravestone incorporates a cross made from the timbers of Nelson's ship, . His grandson William Staveley and grandson-in-law Edward Ashmore were also Admirals of the Fleet.

Arms

See also
 Lieutenant General Sir Vernon Sturdee, his nephew

References

Sources
 
 
 
 Murphy, Hugh & Derek J. Oddy (2010), The Mirror of the Seas; A Centenary History of the Society for Nautical Research London, Society for Nautical Research.

External links

 
 The Papers of Admiral Sir Doveton Sturdee held at Churchill Archives Centre

1859 births
1925 deaths
Burials in Surrey
Royal Navy admirals of World War I
Royal Navy personnel of the Anglo-Egyptian War
Baronets in the Baronetage of the United Kingdom
Royal Navy admirals of the fleet
Recipients of the Legion of Honour
Knights Grand Cross of the Order of the Bath
Knights Commander of the Order of St Michael and St George
Commanders of the Royal Victorian Order
History of the Falkland Islands
Military personnel from London